Vilmos Böhm or Wilhelm Böhm (6 January 1880, Budapest – 28 October 1949) was a Hungarian Social Democrat and Hungary's ambassador to Sweden after World War II. 

He was born in a middle class Jewish family. His parents were Lipót Böhm and Rozália Rosenzweig. After graduation from vocational secondary school, he became a mechanist. 
Böhm was fluent German speaker since his early childhood. During the 1900s, he worked as a technical officer. On 26 December 1905, he married Mária Steiner, who was also of Israelite religion, 
daughter of Ignác Steiner and Franciska Schwarz. He joined the labor movement as a young worker and became secretary of the National Federation of Iron and Metal Workers. 
In 1911, he was elected to the Trade Union Council. He belonged to the center of MSZDP. During the First World War he achieved rank as a lieutenant. In 1918, he was arrested during the general strike.
Böhm was actively involved in the Aster Revolution of 1918, and in January 1919 he became Minister of Defense in the Berinkey Government. As Secretary of State, 
he invited the war hero Aurél Stromfeld to the military chief of staff. He actively participated in the unification congress of the Social Democrat Party and the Communist Party. 
In April Böhm became the commander-in-chief of the Red Army. In May 1919 he resigned, but his resignation was not accepted by government. Böhm remained a member. In July 1919, 
he was appointed ambassador in Vienna. He is supposedly mentioned in the Venona telegrams as an information source of the Soviets during the war. 
After the fall of the Hungarian Soviet republic, he was forced to emigrate and became the leader of a group of emigrant social democrats ("Light Group"), together with Zsigmond Kunfi and Sándor Garbai.

After 1920 Böhm remained in Vienna, joining the ranks of the international social democratic movement. From 1934 he lived in Czechoslovakia, from where he relocated to Sweden in 1938. 
He returned to Hungary only on 30 December 1945. From 1 May 1946, he worked again in Sweden and became ambassador of Hungary. After the unification of the MSZDP and MKP parties,
Böhm resigned from his office, and resumed his life as an emigrant in Stockholm, in 1948. Stripped from Hungarian citizenship on 3 June 1949, he died on 28 October 1949.

One researcher, Wilhelm Agrell, claimed he was a Soviet spy, a statement which has been contested in a trial. Agrell was sued by Böhm's grandchildren Thomas and Stefan Böhm for defamation of the deceased. According to Sweden's libel laws Agrell was acquitted, although he could not produce any other evidence than the mentioning of Vilmos Böhm in the Venona telegrams, where many state leaders and politicians were mentioned under aliases.

References 

 Biography
 Vilmos Bohm

Ambassadors of Hungary to Sweden
Defence ministers of Hungary
Hungarian people of the Hungarian–Romanian War
Raoul Wallenberg
Members of the Executive of the Labour and Socialist International
Jewish Hungarian politicians
Politicians from Budapest
1880 births
1949 deaths